Beachampton is a village and civil parish beside the River Great Ouse in the unitary authority area of Buckinghamshire, England.

History
The village toponym is derived from the Old English for "home farm by a stream".  In the Domesday Book of 1086 it was recorded as Bechentone.

Parts of the village stand on high ground, but most of the village is prone to regular flooding by the stream that runs through the village, a tributary of the River Ouse.

The family name "Beachampton" originates in this village, and was first recorded in manorial records in 1175 when Osmer de Beachampton was a tenant here. There is no documentary evidence for the tradition that Hall Farm in Beachampton was the home of Catherine Parr when she was married to King Henry VIII. 

Beachampton Hall, a Grade II* listed manor house, has elements dating from the 15th century. The present house was probably built by the Piggot family: Sir Thomas Piggot hosted a visit of Queen Anne of Denmark, wife of King James I, and her entourage in July 1603, when the gardens were also laid out. As of 2020, the Hall is for sale with an asking price of £3.5M. 

The Church of England parish church of the Assumption of St Mary the Virgin dates from the 14th century. The Gothic Revival architect G.E. Street rebuilt upper part of the bell-tower in 1873–74. It has family tombs of the Bennett baronets.

References

Sources
 available online at http://www.british-history.ac.uk/report.aspx?compid=62556

External links

Villages in Buckinghamshire
Civil parishes in Buckinghamshire